<re

Robert Kozielski (born 5 September 1968) is a Polish former footballer who played as a striker.

Career

Kozielski started his career with Polish third tier side . In 1988, Kozielski signed for ŁKS Łódź in the Polish top flight, where he made 21 league appearances and scored 5 goals. On 31 July 1988, he debuted for ŁKS Łódź during a 3–3 draw with Stal Mielec. On 31 July 1988, Kozielski scored his first 3 goals for ŁKS Łódź during a 3–3 draw with Stal Mielec. At the age of 22, he retired due to injury.

References

External links

 

1968 births
Association football forwards
Ekstraklasa players
Footballers from Łódź
Living people
ŁKS Łódź players
Polish footballers